= Spanish Gulch =

Valley in Oregon, United States

Coordinates: 42°18′09″N 123°12′44″W

Spanish Gulch is a valley in the U.S. state of Oregon.

Spanish Gulch was named in the 1850s after a "Spanish" mining operation.
